The 2017 U.S. Classic, known as the 2017 Secret U.S. Classic for sponsorship reasons, was the 34rd edition of the U.S. Classic gymnastics tournament. The competition was held on July 29, 2017, at the Sears Centre Arena in the Hoffman Estates suburb of Chicago, Illinois.

Medalists

Participants

Seniors
 Shania Adams – Plain City, Ohio (Buckeye Gymnastics)
 Elena Arenas – Bishop, Georgia (Georgia Elite)
 Luisa Blanco – Plano, Texas (WOGA)
 Jade Carey – Phoenix, Arizona (Oasis Gymnastics)
 Jordan Chiles – Vancouver, Washington (Naydenov Gymnastics, Inc.)
 Leah Clapper – Ann Arbor, Michigan (Gym America)
 Frida Esparza – Pittsburg, California (Head Over Heels)
 Margzetta Frazier – Erial, New Jersey (Parkettes)
 Emily Gaskins – Coral Springs, Florida (Palm Beach)
 Morgan Hurd – Middletown, Delaware (First State Gymnastics)
 Sydney Johnson-Scharpf – Groveland, Florida (Brandy Johnson's Global Gymnastics)
 Laney Madsen – Costa Mesa, California (Gym-Max)
 Riley McCusker – Brielle, New Jersey (MG Elite)
 Marissa Oakley – Oswego, Illinois (Everest Gymnastics)
 Abby Paulson – Coon Rapids, Minnesota (Twin City Twisters)
 Ashton Locklear – Hamlet, North Carolina (Everest)
 Alyona Shchennikova – Layton, Utah (5280 Gymnastics)
 Ragan Smith – Lewisville, Texas (Texas Dreams)
 Deanne Soza – Coppell, Texas (Texas Dreams)
 Trinity Thomas – York, Pennsylvania (Prestige Gymnastics)
 Kalyany Steele – Colorado Springs, Colorado (Colorado Aerials Gymnastics Center)
 Abi Walker – Carrollton, Texas (Texas Dreams)

References 

U.S. Classic
2017 in gymnastics
2017 in sports in Illinois